Cintāmaṇicakra (Chinese (Traditional): 如意輪觀音; Simplified: 如意轮观音; pinyin: Rúyìlún Guānyīn; Japanese: 如意輪観音, Nyoirin Kannon) is a bodhisattva and a manifestation of Avalokiteśvara (known in Chinese as Guanyin). He is counted as one of six different forms of the bodhisattva that represent salvation afforded to beings among the six realms of saṃsāra. Among these incarnations, Cintāmaṇicakra is believed to save those in the deva realm.

Cintāmaṇicakra is sometimes also referred to as Avalokiteśvara as Mahābrahmā the Profound (大梵深遠觀音; Ch. Dàfàn Shēnyuǎn Guānyīn; Jp. Daibon Jin'on Kannon).

Iconography

Cintāmaṇicakra is depicted as having anywhere from two to sixteen arms, with the two-armed and six-armed forms being the more common in Chinese and Japanese art.

In his six-armed form, Cintāmaṇicakra is commonly shown wearing a crown with an effigy of Amitābha Buddha and sitting in a "royal"  position (mahārājalīlāsana, i.e. with his left leg tucked inwards and his right knee raised) atop a lotus on a rock protruding from the ocean - a symbol of Mount Potalaka, Avalokiteśvara's legendary abode. His first right hand touches his face in a pensive mudra, his second right hand holds a cintāmaṇi, and his third right hand holds prayer beads. His first left hand meanwhile touches the rock base he is sitting on, his second left hand holds a crimson lotus flower (padma), and the third left hand holds a Dharma wheel (cakra).

In two-armed images, he does not hold a jewel and he may be seated with his right leg crossed at the ankle over his left leg. This imagery is similar to that of the statue of Maitreya at Chūgū-ji in Nara, which has been mistakenly venerated as Cintāmaṇicakra. Another two-armed form exists where he holds a cintāmaṇi in his right hand and a water vase in his left hand. An example of this variation is the colossal Guanyin statue located in Tsz Shan Monastery in Hong Kong.

Cintāmaṇicakra may also be abstractly represented via his attributes or symbols (samaya; Ch. 三昧耶形, sānmèiyé xíng; Jp. sa(n)maya-gyō), the cintāmaṇi and the lotus flower.

Bījā and mantra

Several mantras are associated with Cintāmaṇicakra. In Chinese Buddhism, the Cintāmaṇicakra Dhāraṇī or Cintāmaṇi Cakravarti Dhāraṇī (如意寶輪王陀羅尼; pinyin: Rúyì Bǎolún Wáng Tuóluóní) is reckoned as one of the Ten Small Mantras (十小咒; pinyin: Shí xiǎo zhòu), a collection of mantras and dhāraṇīs commonly recited in temples during morning liturgical services. The dhāraṇī originates from the Cintāmaṇicakra Dhāraṇī Sutra, which was translated into Chinese by the monks Bodhiruci (如意輪陀羅尼經; pinyin: Rúyìlún tuóluóní jīng; Taishō Tripiṭaka 1080) and Yijing (佛說觀自在菩薩如意心陀羅尼咒經; pinyin: Fóshuō Guānzìzài Púsà rúyì xīn tuóluóní zhòu jīng; T. 1081).

The two shorter mantras are more commonly employed in the Japanese tradition:

Gallery

See also
 Cintamani
 Om mani padme hum
 Ryōgen - Japanese Tendai monk popularly believed to be the incarnation of Cintāmaṇicakra

Notes

References

Bodhisattvas
Avalokiteśvara